Tephrosia socotrana is a species of plant in the family Fabaceae.

Distribution
The plant is endemic to the East African island of Socotra in the Red Sea, that is politically a territory within in West Asian Yemen.

Its natural habitat is rocky areas on the island.

Conservation
Tephrosia socotrana is an IUCN Red List vulnerable species

References

socotrana
Endemic flora of Socotra
Flora of Yemen
Vulnerable flora of Africa
Taxonomy articles created by Polbot